Kinetic military action is a euphemism for military action involving active warfare, including lethal force. The phrase is used to contrast between conventional military force and "soft" force, including diplomacy, sanctions and cyber warfare. United States Defense Secretary Donald Rumsfeld used the words "kinetic" and "non-kinetic" often. 

"Kinetic military action" was used by White House aide Ben Rhodes on March 23, 2011 to describe U.S. military action in Libya:
This use was noted by news media: "'Kinetic military action' is still hell" and "Kinetic Military Action No More".

U.S. Department of Defense used "kinetic operations" on a webpage about "Operation Inherent Resolve". It contained an interactive graphic titled "AIRSTRIKES IN IRAQ AND SYRIA" and captioned "... operations related to ISIL since kinetic operations started on Aug. 8, 2014 ...".

On February 11, 2015, President Obama used "kinetic strike" in a letter to Congress. He wanted, among other things, Congress to "authorize the use of U.S. forces [against ISIL] in ... [ground] missions to enable kinetic strikes". The phrase was not used in the draft resolution proposed to Congress.

On December 2, 2015, Secretary of State John Kerry spoke after attending a series of NATO meetings in Brussels, “There are various ways in which countries can contribute; they don’t necessarily have to be troops, engaged in kinetic action. There are medical facilities, there are other assets that can be deployed, there is intelligence gathering.”

Much earlier, "kinetic" had appeared as a retronymic euphemism for a military attack in Bush at War, a 2002 book by Bob Woodward.

See also
 Newspeak
 War
 Kinetic bombardment
 Kinetic energy

References

Euphemisms
Political communication